Women's Bible can refer to:

 Tseno Ureno (צאנה וראינה), a 1616 Yiddish-language prose work
 The Woman's Bible, an 1890s feminist critique of the Bible